Big Brother Brasil 22 was the twenty-second season of Big Brother Brasil, which premiered on TV Globo on January 17, 2022. The show is produced by Globo and presented by Tadeu Schmidt, (replacing Tiago Leifert, who left the program after five editions) he who makes his debut as the new host of the series.

The grand prize is R$1.5 million with tax allowances, plus a R$150.000 prize offered to the runner-up and a R$50.000 prize offered to the housemate in third place. For the third consecutive year, the show features 20 housemates divided into two groups: "Celebrities", composed of actors, singers, professional athletes, and social media personalities, and "Civilians" composed of everyday Brazilians. On week 4, two new potential housemates entered the game as part of a twist, and they moved into the house through the public vote, bringing the total number of housemates up to 22.

On April 26, 2022, actor & singer Arthur Aguiar won the competition with 68.96% of the public vote over sprinter Paulo André Camilo and actor Douglas Silva.

The game

Withdrawal Button 
For the first time in the show's history, there will be an opt-out button. Thus, the housemate who wants to give up the game can just press the button, without having to resort to the diary room or the production of the program, and leave the program immediately.

The item will be visible to all housemates, in the room of the house.  However, the button will be protected in an illuminated box, closed by a hatch, and can only be activated when indicated by the green light. The button will work at certain times, being unavailable and with red light during parties, from 9 pm to 9 am, to prevent housemates from pressing it while intoxicated.

Super HoH 
Along with its regular powers, the HoH would also be tasked with splitting their housemates into Haves and Have-Nots as well as choosing what and how much each group would be eating.

In season twenty-two, the HoH of the week will gain new perks. The HoH's week will have at his disposal a screen to make his own musical selection in the new "HoH's Playlist" and will be able to promote an animated review with a select group of housemates inside the HoH's room. The new treat can be triggered by tokens during the reign week. However, only members of the Have group can participate in the "little party".

Another unprecedented advantage is the chance to make a direct bridge of interaction with the public: a live that the HoH can open directly on "#RedeBBB", for a limited time, during the "warm up" for the HoH's Party.  The owner of the coveted crown will still have as a gift, in addition to the family portraits, a sticker album with striking images of his or her stay in house.

#FeedBBB 
The theme of the reality show is such that each housemate will use a cellphone to capture moments in the house during a time determined by the production. The cell phone only allows them to post photos and videos to #FeedBBB, and see what other housemates say about each other. It does not allow contact with the outside world.

In season twenty-one, #FeedBBB introduced "Arrow", an app akin to Tinder, which housemates used to pick out their love interests in the house. The "HoH Podcast" is recorded weekly and published on the GShow website. The housemates can see when it is being recorded but do not hear the content.

Glass House 
On Day 26, two additional housemates entered the Glass House where the public voted for them to enter or not enter the house. Twist introduced in Big Brother Brasil 9, re-used in Big Brother Brasil 11 (featuring the first five evicted housemates from that season), Big Brother Brasil 13 and Big Brother Brasil 20.

Fake Eviction 
On day 77, it was announced that there would be a fake eviction.

Power of Veto 
In some weeks, the nominated housemates compete against each other for one last chance to save themselves from eviction. The housemates nominated by the HoH are not eligible to compete and are guaranteed to face Brazil's vote.

Power of No 
At the beginning of each week, the previous Head of Household may or may not be given the opportunity to disqualify some housemates from competing in the upcoming HoH competition.

Big Phone 
Once in a while, the Big Phone rings, unleashing good or bad consequences on the nomination process for those who decide to answer it.

The Counterattack 
The counterattack is a surprise power given to either the HoH's nominee and/or the House's nominee, in which they have the opportunity to automatically nominate an additional housemate for eviction. While viewers are informed when the power will be featured in advance (on Thursdays before the Head of Household competition even takes place), the housemates are only informed about the twist on the spot, during Sunday's live nominations.

Housemates 

The cast list was unveiled on January 14, 2022.

Voting history 
 Key
  – Civilians 
  – Celebrities 
  – Glass House Civilians

Notes

Have and Have-Nots

Ratings and reception

Brazilian ratings 
All numbers are in points and provided by Kantar Ibope Media.

References

External links 
 Official site 

22
2022 Brazilian television seasons